Pickin' the Blues is the title of a recording by American folk music artists Doc Watson and Merle Watson, released in 1985.  In 2006, it was re-issued on a limited edition, 180 gram all-analog virgin vinyl record from Analogue Productions.

Reception

Writing for Allmusic, music critic Eugene Chadbourne wrote of the album "What we have here is really a delightful blend of several different blues traditions, transcending the stupid questions of race as if it were a bit of dust that can be blown off the phonograph needle... Watson is such a fine vocalist that he is able to make a number such as this sound relatively fresh, no doubt helped by a blend of acoustic instruments not normally associated with this type of tune. But whatever style the players take on, everything is performed beautifully with deep feeling, comfortable tempos, and inspired picking that is never simply grandstanding. Fans of acoustic guitar will love this record — the instruments are recorded beautifully, especially in that warm, sonorous mid-register."

Track listing
All songs Traditional unless otherwise noted.
 "Mississippi Heavy Water Blues" (Barbeque Bob) – 2:48
 "Sittin' Here Pickin' the Blues" (Coleman, Watson) – 3:07
 "Stormy Weather" (Harold Arlen, Ted Koehler) – 3:44
 "Windy and Warm" (John D. Loudermilk) – 2:02
 "St. Louis Blues" (W. C. Handy) – 2:59
 "Jailhouse Blues" (Sleepy John Estes) – 2:40
 "Freight Train Blues" – 2:35
 "Hobo Bill's Last Ride" (Jimmie Rodgers) – 3:36
 "Carroll County Blues" – 2:47
 "Blue Ridge Mountain Blues" – 2:44
 "I'm a Stranger Here" – 3:07
 "Honey Babe Blues" – 3:20

Personnel
Doc Watson – guitar, vocals, harmonica
Merle Watson – guitar, slide guitar
T. Michael Coleman – bass, harmony vocals
Sam Bush – fiddle, mandolin
Joe Smothers – background vocals (Track 2 Only)
Production notes
Produced by Mitch Greenhill
Mixed by Garth Fundis
Engineered by Carl Rudisill
Mastered by Roger Seibel (Original Release)

References

External links
 Doc Watson discography

1985 albums
Doc Watson albums
Flying Fish Records albums